The 157th Field Artillery Battalion was a Field Artillery battalion of the Army National Guard.

History
There were two units issued this number, this is the New Jersey unit. The Colorado Unit postdates the New Jersey unit.

Lineage
Organized in the New Jersey National Guard as the 3rd Battalion, 157th Field Artillery and Federally recognized 16 June 1937 at Vineland.
Inducted into Federal service 16 September 1940 at Vineland as an element of the 44th Infantry Division.
Redesignated 7 January 1941 as the 2nd Battalion, 157th Field artillery.
Reorginazed and redesignated as the 157th Field Artillery Battalion and assigned to the 44th Infantry Division. 17 February 1942.
Relieved from the 44th Infantry Division and inactivated at Camp Chaffee, Arkansas, 12 November 1945.
Redesignated 9 July 1946 as the 114th Tank Battalion.

Current units
See 102nd Cavalry Regiment (United States)

Coat of arms
 Shield
Gules a Gatling gun or, in base a giant cactus and shoulder sleeve insignia of the 29th Infantry Division proper, on a canton argent a saltire azure.
 Crest
That for the New Jersey National Guard.
 Background
The Shield is red for artillery. The Gatling gun refers to association with the 157th and 112th Field artillery regiments of New Jersey. Service of elements of the battalion is represented by the giant cactus for the Mexican border, the shoulder sleeve insignia of the 29th Division for service in France during World War I, and the canton for Civil War service.

157_FA_Regiment_DUI.jpg

Campaign credits
World War II
 Northern France
 Rhineland
 Ardennes-Alsace
 Central Europe

Decorations
None

See also
 Field Artillery Branch (United States)
 U.S. Army Regimental System
 List of field artillery regiments of the United States

References

 Historical register and dictionary of the United States Army, from ..., Volume 1 By Francis Bernard Heitman 
 Encyclopedia of United States Army insignia and uniforms By William K. Emerson (page 51).
   lineage

External links
 http://www.history.army.mil/html/forcestruc/lineages/branches/av/default.htm 
 http://www.gjsims.com/dadsty.htm

Field artillery battalions of the United States Army
Military units and formations established in 1937